Washington High School is a 9–12 public high school in Charles Town, West Virginia, United States. The population growth in the county required a "de-consolidation" in 2007, as the single county high school, formerly known as Jefferson County High School, established in 1972, was renamed simply Jefferson High School, and the county split into two zones, with the eastern half of the county attending the new Washington High School.

References

External links 
 

Public high schools in West Virginia
Schools in Jefferson County, West Virginia
2007 establishments in West Virginia
Educational institutions established in 2007